The 2000 Northern Arizona Lumberjacks football team was an American football team that represented Northern Arizona University (NAU) as a member of the Big Sky Conference (Big Sky) during the 2000 NCAA Division I-AA football season. In their third year under head coach Jerome Souers, the Lumberjacks compiled a 3–8 record (2–6 against conference opponents), were outscored by a total of 275 to 245, and tied for seventh place in the Big Sky.

The team played its home games at the J. Lawrence Walkup Skydome, commonly known as the Walkup Skydome, in Flagstaff, Arizona.

Schedule

References

Northern Arizona
Northern Arizona Lumberjacks football seasons
Northern Arizona Lumberjacks football